Paracles discalis is a moth of the subfamily Arctiinae first described by George Hampson in 1905. It is found in Paraguay.

References

Moths described in 1905
Paracles